Moises Esmeralda is a paralympic athlete from Spain competing mainly in category F11 long and triple jump events.

Moises was amongst the Spanish team that travelled to Atlanta for the 1996 Summer Paralympics where he competed in the triple jump and long jump.  Unfortunately he failed to registered a performance in the long jump before finishing second in the long jump to France's Stephane Bozzolo who won in a new Paralympic record.

References

External links
 

Year of birth missing (living people)
Living people
Spanish male long jumpers
Spanish male triple jumpers
Paralympic athletes of Spain
Paralympic silver medalists for Spain
Paralympic athletes with a vision impairment
Paralympic medalists in athletics (track and field)
Athletes (track and field) at the 1996 Summer Paralympics
Medalists at the 1996 Summer Paralympics
Visually impaired long jumpers
Visually impaired triple jumpers
Paralympic long jumpers
Paralympic triple jumpers
Spanish blind people